is a Japanese manga series written and illustrated by Shin Takahashi. The manga was serialized in Shogakukan's Weekly Shōnen Sunday from September 2002 to March 2004, but Takahashi stopped its serialization and continued releasing the story directly via tankōbon volumes. A total of nine tankōbon volumes were published from January 2003 to July 2010. A 2-chapter story, titled "Spica", was published in Weekly Shōnen Sunday in 2010 and 2013.

Story
Ikoro is a thirteen-year-old girl who is the princess of the "Upper World", a world where snow is always falling and even princesses like her are forced to wake up at 4 a.m. and go to bed at midnight, learning and working the rest of the day. The Upper World is a "country of night", surrounded on four sides by towering walls and with perpetual below-freezing temperatures.  
Ikoro lives with her blind young brother Mataku and her servants Shā (or "Gramma") and the monkey-like Kuro. Her parents have left them apparently seeking out the legend of a "sun".

One day, Ikoro's dinner with her brother is interrupted by a strange boy crashing through the ceiling. Ikoro finds that the boy is wearing manacles and has white hair. The boy has lost his memory and is dubbed "Shiro". Ikoro and Shiro are both , which means that she cannot feel joy and he cannot feel pain. The two of them go towards the "Lower World" deciding that they will find a sun.

Characters

Princess of the snow country, a 13-year-old prodigy who has skipped 6 grades and has only books as her constant companionship. She is constantly ostracized as a result of her inability to smile and the declining position of the royal house.

An amnesiac boy who cannot feel pain. Ikoro names him "Shiro" based on his white hair, but it also means "missing piece" in the ancient language of her country. His constant question "Are you foe or friend?" is supposedly a teaching from his grandfather, the man who brought him up.

Ikoro's blind younger brother.

Publication
Written and illustrated by Shin Takahashi, Kimi no Kakera began in Shogakukan's Weekly Shōnen Sunday on September 4, 2002. It went on hiatus after its chapter released on April 2, 2003. It resumed publication in the magazine for ten chapters from January 8 to March 17, 2004. The series then continued publication directly via tankōbon volumes. The series' first six volumes were published by Shogakukan from January 18, 2003 to August 10, 2007. The 7th volume was released, after a full 26-month hiatus, on October 16, 2009. The 8th and 9th final volumes were released on January 18 and  July 16, 2010.

A short story, titled , was published in Weekly Shōnen Sunday on July 21, 2010. Another story, titled , was published in Weekly Shōnen Sunday on July 3, 2013. These chapters were published by Shogakukan in a volume, which included another story, on August 16, 2013.

Volume list

References

External links

Adventure anime and manga
Fantasy anime and manga
Shogakukan manga
Shōnen manga